The BBC One "Lens" idents are the current set of on-screen channel identities used on BBC One; soft launched with the channel's Christmas presentation in December 2021, and officially launched on 1 April 2022, replacing the 'Oneness' idents. The identity was developed by BBC Creative and branding agency ManvsMachine.

Components of look 

ManvsMachine said the idents are designed to capture "British life through multiple lenses". Each ident features a large community space, being utilised for a variety of different purposes. The idents present these spaces by slowly rotating around the image, with a circular, lens effect showing parts of the space being used for different events, during different times of day, and in different configurations. Each location has a set of three idents each; corresponding scenes from the other two idents are shown within the lens. The lens device pays homage to BBC One's past use of a circle shape as part of its idents from the 1960s, including the globe, balloon and circle idents. The music of the idents were produced by Resonate, a sound design agency in London.

The idents were originally intended to launch in October 2021 alongside the introduction of the new BBC logo, but the launch was delayed to April 2022; the remainder of the presentation package associated with the idents was launched with the new logo, but the channel continued to use a repackaged version of the existing "Oneness" idents until 1 April 2022.

Idents

Regular idents

Special idents

Christmas idents

See also

 History of BBC television idents

References 

BBC One
BBC Idents
Television presentation in the United Kingdom